Sidi Amar may refer to:

Places
 In Algeria:
Sidi Amar, Annaba
Sidi Amar, Saïda
Sidi Amar, Tipaza
Zawiyet Sidi Amar Cherif, Boumerdès
Mount Sidi Amar, a 1,985 m high mountain in the Ouarsenis Range
 In Morocco:
Sidi Amar, Morocco
 In Mali:
Bourem Sidi Amar, a village and commune of the Diré Cercle, Tombouctou Region, Mali

People
 Sidi Mahmoud Ben Amar, a revered Muslim whose tomb in Timbuktu is a UNESCO World Heritage Site